The 1998–99 National Football League, known for sponsorship reasons as the Church & General National Football League, was the 68th staging of the National Football League (NFL), an annual Gaelic football tournament for the Gaelic Athletic Association county teams of Ireland.

Cork beat Dublin in the final. The tournament introduced yellow and red cards to Gaelic football for the first time. It also had an experimental rule forbidding goalkeepers from handpassing the ball — this latter rule was not continued.

Format 
The top 16 teams are drawn into sections 1A and 1B. The other 17 teams are drawn into sections 2A and 2B. Each team plays all the other teams in its section once: either home or away. Teams earn 2 points for a win and 1 for a draw.

Titles
Teams in both divisions competed for the National Football League title.

Knockout stage qualifiers
Eight teams qualify for the NFL quarter-finals:
The top three teams in each of sections 1A and 1B
The first-placed teams in each of sections 2A and 2B

Promotion and relegation

 Division One (A): bottom 2 teams demoted to Division Two
 Division One (B): bottom 2 teams demoted to Division Two
 Division Two (A): top 2 teams promoted to Division One. 
 Division Two (B): top 2 teams promoted to Division One.

Group stage

Division One

Final standings

Group A

Group B

Division two

Final standings

Group A

Group B

Knockout stage

Quarter-finals

Semi-finals

Finals

References

National Football League
National Football League
National Football League (Ireland) seasons